The 1923 South Dakota Coyotes football team was an American football team that represented the University of South Dakota in the North Central Conference (NCC) during the 1923 college football season. In its second season under head coach Stub Allison, the team compiled a 4–3–1 record (1–3–1 against NCC opponents), finished in seventh place out of eight teams in the NCC, and outscored opponents by a total of 119 to 60.

Schedule

References

South Dakota
South Dakota Coyotes football seasons
South Dakota Coyotes football